Murtaza Nizam Shah I, the eldest son of Hussain Nizam Shah I, succeeded him in 1565 after his death.

Reign 
During the first six years, his mother Khunza Humayun controlled the affairs of kingdom, but her repeated military failures against her neighbours led the Nizam Shahi nobility to help Murtaza take the reins of administration in his own hands. He retrieved the situation and recovered Udgir from Bijapur. In 1574 he annexed Berar to Ahmednagar; in 1588 he was killed and succeeded by his son Hussain Nizam Shah II.

References

Sultans
16th-century Indian monarchs
16th-century Indian Muslims
People from Gujarat
Gujarati people
1588 deaths